O'Leary Peak is an extinct Pleistocene lava dome volcano within the San Francisco volcanic field, north of Flagstaff, Arizona, and to the northwest of Sunset Crater National Monument. A fire lookout tower was built on a subsidiary eastern peak.

References

External links
 
 "O'Leary Peak Trail". Coconino National Forest.
 

Volcanoes of Arizona
Mountains of Arizona
Landforms of Coconino County, Arizona
Extinct volcanoes
Mountains of Coconino County, Arizona